Kamenka is a rural locality (a selo) and the administrative centre of Kamensky Selsoviet, Bizhbulyaksky District, Bashkortostan, Russia. The population was 512 as of 2010. There are 8 streets.

Geography 
Kamenka is located 28 km southwest of Bizhbulyak (the district's administrative centre) by road. Progress is the nearest rural locality.

References 

Rural localities in Bizhbulyaksky District